Adaklu Waya is the capital of the Adaklu District. It is one of the districts of the Volta Region, Ghana.

History

Geography

Location
Adaklu Waya is located in the Volta Region and it's the main district to Adaklu towns.

References

Populated places in the Volta Region